Abd al-Hoseyn Khatunabadi  (23 March 1630 – March 1694) was a 17th-century Persian historian of Safavid Iran, who is principally known for his historical chronicle of Vaqa'e' al-senin, referred to as the "most important source from the last decades of Safavid rule."

Khatunabadi belonged to a prominent family of sayyid origin, which traced their ancestry back to the Shi'i imam Ali ibn Husayn Zayn al-Abidin (died 713). Although the family lived in Isfahan, they originally belonged to Qom, where they occupied the office of naqib (head of the sayyid families) in a hereditary fashion. It was Khatunabadi's paternal great-grandfather, Mir Emad al-Din Mohammad (also known as Shahmorad), who had moved to Isfahan in the 16th century, settling in a small village nearby, named Khatunabad.

Khatunabadi received his education in Isfahan, mostly under his father. He later observed the lectures of the pishnamaz (prayer imam) of Isfahan, Molla Reza-qoli (died 1661/62) at the Shah Mosque.

Khatunabadi completed his Vaqa'e' al-senin in 1687/88, which he arranged into three segments.

References

Sources 

 
 

1630 births
1694 deaths
Writers from Isfahan
17th-century Iranian historians
17th-century people of Safavid Iran
Safavid historians